"The Journey'" is a song by English boy band 911. It was released on 30 June 1997 in the United Kingdom through Virgin Records as the sixth and final single from their debut studio album, The Journey (1997). It peaked at number three on the UK Singles Chart and remained in the chart for seven weeks.

Critical reception
British magazine Music Week rated "The Journey" five out of five, picking it as Single of the Week. They added, "The title track from the Top 10 album has been given a fresh, choir-enhanced, lushly orchestrated treatment and now sounds strong enough to give the teen sensations their first chart topper."

Track listings
 CD, Single
 "The Journey" (Radio Edit) - 4:45
 "The Journey" (Extended Mix) - 5:30
 "The Journey" (Album Version) - 4:46
 "Don't Make Me Wait" (Live) - 4:23

Charts

References

External links
 

1997 singles
1997 songs
911 (English group) songs
Virgin Records singles
EMI Records singles
Song recordings produced by Eliot Kennedy
Pop ballads